The following is a list of players used by each competing nation during the entirety of the 1996 OFC Nations Cup.

Coach:  Keith Pritchett

Coach:  Eddie Thomson and  Raul Blanco (caretaker)

Coach:  Umberto Mottini

Coach: Edward Ngara

External links
https://www.rsssf.org/tables/96oc.html

squads
OFC Nations Cup squads